Valdan Nimani (born 5 March 1987) is an Albanian football player who plays as a forward.

Club career

Early career
Nimani started his professional career with Laçi in the 2008–09 season, where he aided the club to return in Albanian Superliga with 5 goals in 17 appearances. Nimani made his Albanian Superliga debut in the opening match against Skënderbeu Korçë on 23 August 2009, where he scored the first goal of the match in a 4–3 losing effort.

Vllaznia Shkodër
On 25 July 2010, Nimani agreed personal terms and signed a contract with his boyhood club Vllaznia Shkodër. He made his Vllaznia Shkodër on 22 August in the opening league match of 2010–11 season against Bylis Ballsh at home, he played full-90 minutes in a 3–2 win.

In the last days of 2011, Nimani was released from the club along with two other players.

Laçi
On 9 January 2012, Nimani officially returned to Laçi after one-and-a-half season with Vllaznia Shkodër, taking the squad number 19 for the second part of 2011–12 season.

2012–13 season
Nimani started his fifth season with the club on 25 August 2012 in the 1–1 home draw against Besa Kavajë, where he played in the entire match. He scored his first goal of the season on 26 September in the first leg of 2012–13 Albanian Cup first round against Adriatiku Mamurras, netting the third and final goal of the 3–0 away win.

2013–14 season
Nimani played his first match of the season on 1 September 2013 against Tirana at Qemal Stafa Stadium in team's first league match of the season, playing in the entire match that finished in a goalless draw.

On 15 March 2014, during the match against Bylis Ballsh which ended in a goalless draw but was awarded to Laçi with a 3–0 win, Nimani suffered a flaw rib which kept him out for two weeks.

2014–15 season
Nimani started the new season on 3 July 2014 in the first leg of the 2014–15 UEFA Europa League first qualifying round against the Slovenian side Rudar Velenje, where he played full-90 minutes in a 1–1 away draw. The returning leg ended in the same results, but Laçi managed to qualify thanks to penalty shootouts; Nimani played for 82 minutes. In the next qualifying round, Laçi faced Zorya Luhansk who defeated Nimani's side 3–0 in the first leg at Laçi Stadium. In the second leg, Laçi was defeated again but this time 2–1, with Nimani scoring his side only goal, becoming the club's all-time top goalscorer in European competitions.

Nimani started the domestic season by playing full-90 minutes in team's opening Albanian Superliga match against Partizani Tirana, which finished in a 1–1 draw.

2015–16 season
As 2014–15 Albanian Cup winners, Laçi gained the right to enter the 2015–16 UEFA Europa League first qualifying round where Nimani's side was going to face Inter Baku. In the first leg at home on 2 July, Nimani played only 34 minutes as a substitute with Laçi who didn't earn more than a 1–1 draw. In the second match, Nimani played as a starter for 82 minutes, failing to find the net with the match finishing in a goalless draw, which resulted fatal for the team who was eliminated thanks to away goal rule.

On 27 February of the following year, in the final moments of the goalless draw away against Vllaznia Shkodër, Nimani was involved in an incident with Vllaznia Shkodër's Erdenis Gurishta, hitting him in the head with his right boot, leaving the defender in the ground unconscious. Gurishta was immediately transported in the nearest hospital in Shkodër, and after hours of fear and anxiety, Gurishta's condition was finally stabilized.

Career statistics

Honours
Laçi
 Albanian Cup (2): 2012–13, 2014–15
 Albanian Supercup (1): 2015

References

External links

1987 births
Living people
Footballers from Shkodër
Albanian footballers
People from Shkodër County
Association football midfielders
Association football forwards
KF Laçi players
KF Vllaznia Shkodër players
FC Kamza players
KF Tërbuni Pukë players
KS Veleçiku Koplik players
Kategoria Superiore players
Kategoria e Parë players